The year 2021 was the 28th year in the history of the Ultimate Fighting Championship (UFC), a mixed martial arts promotion based in the United States.

Releases and retirements
These fighters have either been released from their UFC contracts, announced their retirement or joined other promotions:

Aalon Cruz - Released in May - Lightweight
Al Iaquinta - Retired in November - Lightweight
Alan Jouban - Retired in May - Welterweight
Adam Yandiev - Released in March - Middleweight
Aleksandra Albu - Released in February - Women's Strawweight
Alex Chambers - Released in February - Women's Strawweight
Alexander Yakovlev - Released in June - Lightweight
Alexey Kunchenko - Signed with PFL - Welterweight
Alistair Overeem - Released in March - Heavyweight
Ali Alqaisi - Released in February - Bantamweight
Anderson dos Santos - Released in August - Bantamweight
Andrew Sanchez - Released in October - Middleweight
Antônio Carlos Júnior - Released in February - Middleweight
Anthony Birchak - Released in May - Bantamweight
Anthony Ivy - Released in February - Welterweight
Anthony Rocco Martin - Moving to other promotion in January - Welterweight
Antônio Arroyo - Released in October - Middleweight
Antônio Braga Neto - Released in September - Middleweight
Bartosz Fabiński - Released in May - Middleweight
Bethe Correia - Retired in October - Women's Bantamweight
Bharat Khandare - Released in November - Featherweight
Bojan Mihajlović - Released in February - Light Heavyweight
Brok Weaver - Released in March - Lightweight
Carlos Condit - Retired in September - Welterweight
Carlton Minus - Released in February - Lightweight
Chris de la Rocha - Released in February - Heavyweight
Christian Aguilera - Released in May - Welterweight
 Cláudia Gadelha - Reitred in December - Women's Strawweight
Cole Williams - Released in February - Welterweight
Dan Hardy - Released in May - Welterweight
Darren Stewart - Released in August - Middleweight
Demian Maia - End of contract - Welterweight
Diego Sanchez - Released in April - Welterweight
Dmitry Sosnovskiy - Released in February - Heavyweight
Don Madge - Signed with PFL - Lightweight
Drako Rodriguez  - Released in August - Bantamweight
Emil Weber Meek - Released in June - Welterweight
Emily Whitmire - Released in September - Women's Flyweight
Felicia Spencer - Retired in December - Women's Featherweight
Gabriel Silva - Released in March - Bantamweight
Geraldo de Freitas - Released in March - Bantamweight
Gian Villante - Retired in November - Heavyweight
Gökhan Saki - Released in February - Light Heavyweight
Impa Kasanganay - Released in December - Welterweight 
Irwin Rivera - Released in January - Bantamweight
Jamey Simmons - Released in August - Bantamweight
Jacob Kilburn - Released in February - Featherweight
Jerome Rivera - Released in August - Flyweight
Jimmie Rivera - End of contract - Bantamweight
Jimmy Flick - Retired in April - Flyweight
Joe Ellenberger - Released in July - Lightweight
John Allan - Released in November - Light Heavyweight
Johnny Eduardo - Released in October - Bantamweight
Jordan Espinosa - Released in March - Flyweight
Jordan Griffin - Released in May - Featherweight
José Alberto Quiñónez - Released in March - Bantamweight
Joseph Benavidez - Retired in September - Flyweight
Junior Dos Santos - Released in March - Heavyweight
Justin Jaynes - Released in August - Featherweight
Justine Kish - Released in April - Women's Flyweight
Kai Kamaka III - Contract ended in August - Featherweight
KB Bhullar - Released in May - Middleweight
Kevin Lee - Released in November - Welterweight
Khama Worthy - Released in November - Lightweight
Lara Procópio - Released in July - Women's Flyweight
Laureano Staropoli - Released in November - Middleweight
Liana Jojua - Released in November - Women's Flyweight
Liliya Shakirova - Released in September - Women's Flyweight
Lívia Renata Souza - Released in November - Women's Strawweight
Luis Peña - Released in October - Lightweight
Luke Sanders - Released in May - Bantamweight
Marion Reneau - Retired in July - Women's Bantamweight
Markus Perez - Released in February - Middleweight
Martin Day - Released in February - Bantamweight
Maurice Greene - Released in May - Heavyweight
Megan Anderson - Contract ended in March - Women's Featherweight
Michel Prazeres - Released - Welterweight 
Mike Perry - Signed with BKFC - Welterweight
Mike Rodríguez - Released in October - Light Heavyweight
Mirsad Bektić - Retired in July - Featherweight
Modestas Bukauskas - Released in October - Light Heavyweight
Nicco Montaño - Released in August - Women's Flyweight
Nik Lentz - Retired in January - Featherweight
Omari Akhmedov - Released in July - Middleweight
Paul Felder - Retired in May - Lightweight
Peter Barrett - Released in February - Featherweight
Randa Markos - Released in November - Women's Strawweight
Raphael Pessoa - Released in July - Heavyweight
Ray Rodriguez - Released in April - Bantamweight
Rhys McKee - Released in January - Welterweight
Ronaldo Souza - Released in May - Middleweight
Roosevelt Roberts - Released in August - Lightweight
Roque Martinez - Released in June - Heavyweight
Ryan Benoit - Released in August - Flyweight
Sarah Alpar - Released in October - Women's Flyweight
Sarah Moras - Released in February - Women's Bantamweight
Shana Dobson - Released in March - Women's Flyweight
Spike Carlyle - Released In February - Featherweight
Stefan Sekulić - Released in July - Welterweight
Stefan Struve - Retired in February - Heavyweight
Suman Mokhtarian - Released in February - Featherweight
Syuri Kondo - Released in February - Women's Strawweight
Teemu Packalén - Retired in November - Lightweight
Thomas Almeida - Released in October - Bantamweight
Tyron Woodley - Contract ended in April - Welterweight
Vanessa Melo - Released in February - Women's Bantamweight
Vince Cachero - Released in March - Bantamweight
Vinicius Moreira - Released in February - Light heavyweight
Yancy Medeiros - Released in August - Welterweight
Yorgan De Castro - Released in April - Heavyweight

Debut UFC fighters
The following fighters fought their first UFC fight in 2021:

Albert Duraev - UFC 267
Alex Pereira - UFC 268
Allan Nascimento - UFC 267
Andre Petroski - UFC on ESPN 30
Aori Qileng - UFC 261
Benoît Saint-Denis - UFC 267
Brady Hiestand - UFC on ESPN 30
Brandon Jenkins - UFC Fight Night 192
Bruno Silva - UFC on ESPN 25
Bruno Souza - UFC 268
Bryan Battle - UFC on ESPN 30
Carlos Ulberg - UFC 259
Casey O'Neill - UFC Fight Night 185
Carlston Harris - UFC on ESPN 24
Cheyanne Vlismas - UFC on ESPN 21
Chris Barnett - UFC Fight Night 188
Chris Curtis - UFC 268
CJ Vergara - UFC 268
Cody Brundage - UFC 266
Collin Anglin - UFC on ESPN 28
Dakota Bush - UFC on ESPN 22
Daniel Lacerda - UFC Fight Night 196
Darian Weeks - UFC on ESPN 31
David Onama - UFC Fight Night 196
Drako Rodriguez - UFC Fight Night 185
Elise Reed - UFC on ESPN 27
Erick Gonzalez - UFC Fight Night 195
Erin Blanchfield - UFC Fight Night 192
Francisco Figueiredo - UFC on ESPN 20
Fabio Cherant - UFC 260
Gaetano Pirrello - UFC on ESPN 20
Gilbert Urbina - UFC on ESPN 30
Gloria de Paula - UFC Fight Night 187
Gregory Rodrigues - UFC Fight Night 189
Harry Hunsucker - UFC on ESPN 21
Ian Garry - UFC 268
Ignacio Bahamondes - UFC on ABC 2
Istela Nunes - UFC Fight Night 195
Jeff Molina - UFC 261
Jared Vanderaa - UFC Fight Night 185
Jeremiah Wells - UFC Fight Night 190
Jesse Strader - UFC on ESPN 21
Joselyne Edwards - UFC on ABC 1
Josiane Nunes - UFC on ESPN 29
JP Buys - UFC on ESPN 21
Juancamilo Ronderos - UFC Fight Night 188
Kamuela Kirk - UFC Fight Night 189
Kris Moutinho - UFC 264
Leomana Martinez - UFC on ESPN 30
Liudvik Sholinian - UFC Fight Night 191
Luana Pinheiro - UFC on ESPN 23
Luis Saldaña - UFC on ABC 2
Lupita Godinez - UFC on ESPN 22
Mandy Böhm - UFC Fight Night 192
Manel Kape - UFC Fight Night 184
Manon Fiorot - UFC on ESPN 20
Marcelo Rojo  - UFC Fight Night 187
Maria de Oliveira Neta - UFC Fight Night 196
Martin Sano Jr. - UFC 266
Mason Jones - UFC on ESPN 20
Melissa Gatto - UFC 265
Melsik Baghdasaryan - UFC on ESPN 28
Michael Chandler - UFC 257
Micheal Gillmore - UFC on ESPN 30
Mike Breeden - UFC Fight Night 193
Montserrat Ruiz - UFC on ESPN 21
Na Liang - UFC 261
Natan Levy - UFC Fight Night 198
Nick Maximov - UFC 266
Paddy Pimblett - UFC Fight Night 191
Pat Sabatini - UFC 261
Philip Rowe - UFC 258
Preston Parsons - UFC on ESPN 26
Orion Cosce - UFC on ESPN 28	
Rafa García  - UFC Fight Night 187
Rafael Alves - UFC Fight Night 188
Ricky Turcios - UFC on ESPN 30
Rong Zhu - UFC 261
Ronnie Lawrence - UFC Fight Night 186
Saidyokub Kakhramonov - UFC on ESPN 29
Sergey Morozov - UFC on ESPN 20	
Shayilan Nuerdanbieke - UFC Fight Night 188
Silvana Gómez Juárez - UFC Fight Night 194
Tabatha Ricci - UFC Fight Night 189
Terrance McKinney - UFC 263
Tucker Lutz - UFC 262
Umar Nurmagomedov - UFC on ESPN 20	
Uroš Medić - UFC 259	
Vanessa Demopoulos - UFC on ESPN 30
Victoria Leonardo - UFC on ESPN 20	
Zviad Lazishvili - UFC Fight Night 196

Suspended fighters
The list below is based on fighters suspended either by (1) United States Anti-Doping Agency (USADA) or World Anti-Doping Agency (WADA) for violation of taking prohibited substances or non-analytical incidents, (2) by local commissions on misconduct during the fights or at event venues, or (3) by the UFC for reasons also stated below.

The Ultimate Fighter
The following The Ultimate Fighter seasons are scheduled for broadcast in 2021:

Title fights

Events list

See also
 List of UFC champions
 List of UFC events
 List of current UFC fighters

References

External links
 UFC past events on UFC.com
 UFC events results at Sherdog.com

Ultimate Fighting Championship by year
2021 in mixed martial arts